This page lists the major power stations located in Shanxi province.

Non-renewable

Coal based

Renewable

Hydroelectric

Conventional

Pumped-storage

References 

Power stations
Shanxi